The District of Columbia, capital of the United States, is home to 75 National Historic Landmarks.  The National Historic Landmark program is operated under the auspices of the National Park Service, and recognizes structures, districts, objects, and similar resources according to a list of criteria of national significance. The city's landmarks reflect its status as the national capital, including grand government buildings, homes of politicians, military facilities, and museums.  The list also includes sites relating to support for the disabled, the Civil Rights Movement, pioneering urban infrastructure, and other historic themes.

National Historic Landmarks are normally listed on the National Register of Historic Places.  Washington is home to three specifically legislated exceptions to this rule: the White House, the United States Capitol, and the United States Supreme Court Building.  All are designated landmarks, but are not on the National Register.

Current NHLs

|}

Moved NHLs
There are no delisted NHLs in Washington, D.C.  Ships that are designated NHLs have previously been located in Washington, but have been moved elsewhere, and the Army Medical Museum and Library collection has been relocated to Maryland.

See also
National Register of Historic Places listings in Washington, D.C.
List of U.S. National Historic Landmarks by state
District of Columbia Inventory of Historic Sites
Historic preservation
National Register of Historic Places
History of Washington, D.C.
 Timeline of Washington, D.C.

References

External links

National Historic Landmark Program at the National Park Service
Lists of National Historic Landmarks
Washington, DC, a National Park Service Discover Our Shared Heritage Travel Itinerary

 
National Historic Landmarks
National Historic Landmarks

National Historic Landmarks
Washington, D.C.